Christian Stübi (born 10 April 1970) is a retired Swiss football midfielder.

References

1970 births
Living people
Swiss men's footballers
FC St. Gallen players
FC Schaffhausen players
Association football midfielders
Swiss Super League players
FC Schaffhausen managers
Swiss football managers